David Philip Pannick, Baron Pannick,  (born 7 March 1956) is a British barrister and a crossbencher in the House of Lords. He practises mainly in the areas of public law and human rights. He has argued cases before the Supreme Court of the United Kingdom, the Appellate Committee of the House of Lords, the European Court of Justice, and the European Court of Human Rights.

Early life and education
David Philip Pannick was born on 7 March 1956 in Islington, London, England, to Maurice and Rita Pannick. Having won a scholarship, he was educated at Bancroft's School, a private school in Woodford Green, London. He studied law at Hertford College, Oxford, from which he graduated with a Bachelor of Arts (BA) and a postgraduate Bachelor of Civil Law (BCL) degree: as per tradition, his BA was promoted to a Master of Arts (MA) degree.

Career
He was called to the Bar at Gray's Inn in 1979, and was one of the panel of Junior Counsel to the Crown (Common Law) from 1988 to 1992, when he was appointed Queen's Counsel, as the title was known during the reign of Elizabeth II. He was also appointed a Recorder on the South Eastern Circuit in 1995, and a deputy High Court judge in 1998. He stopped sitting as a judge in 2005.

Pannick has appeared in the courts of Hong Kong, Brunei, Gibraltar, Trinidad, the British Virgin Islands, Bermuda and the Cayman Islands. He appeared in 100 cases before the Appellate Committee of the House of Lords before its jurisdiction was transferred to the new Supreme Court in October 2009.

As an academic
He was elected as an examination fellow of All Souls College, Oxford, in 1978. He became an honorary fellow of Hertford College, Oxford, in September 2004. He has written on legal matters for The Times, and was co-author with the late Lord Lester of Herne Hill QC of Human Rights Law and Practice (1st edition 1999; 2nd edition 2004, 3rd edition 2009).

Peerage
On 29 September 2008, the House of Lords Appointments Commission announced that Pannick had been nominated for a life peerage as a crossbencher. His title was gazetted as Baron Pannick, of Radlett in the county of Hertfordshire, dated 3 November 2008.

Noted cases
In the 1980s Pannick appeared for the Sunday Times in the Spycatcher case. He acted for the gay servicemen who established in the European Court of Human Rights in 1999 a finding of unlawful dismissal because of his sexual orientation; represented Camelot PLC in the High Court in 2000 and established that the National Lottery Commission had treated it unfairly in rejecting its application to renew its licence to run the National Lottery; acted for the League Against Cruel Sports in defending a challenge to the validity of the Hunting Act 2004; represented a woman who established that she was entitled to be prescribed with the breast cancer drug Herceptin; and was briefed by the Kingdom of Saudi Arabia in its claim to state immunity against claims of torture.

In 2007, Pannick appeared for BBC director-general Mark Thompson when an attempt was made to prosecute the BBC for blasphemy for broadcasting Jerry Springer: The Opera. In July 2008, he represented the British Olympic Committee in successfully resisting in the High Court the claim by athlete Dwain Chambers about the refusal to select him for the Beijing Olympics because of the earlier finding of doping. Later that year he represented Debbie Purdy in the Appellate Committee of the Lords (the last judgement given in the House of Lords) to establish the duty of the Director of Public Prosecutions to publish guidelines on prosecuting for assisting a suicide.

More recently Pannick acted for AF, a man subject to a control order, establishing that the Home Secretary had a duty to inform him of the essence of the case against him. He represented the Crown in the Supreme Court in establishing in 2010 that MPs accused of dishonestly claiming expenses were not entitled to the benefit of parliamentary privilege. In January 2011, he represented Max Mosley before the European Court of Human Rights in his claim that the right to privacy obliged the United Kingdom to impose duties on newspapers to give prior notice of a publication invading privacy so the subject could seek an injunction. He appeared for a school (JFS) in the first hearing before the new Supreme Court on 2 October 2009, about the school's admissions policy. In 2011 and 2012, Pannick also represented the Government of Hong Kong in Vallejos v. Commissioner of Registration, a case in which a foreign domestic helper sought judicial review to determine whether it was constitutional for the government to deny her the right of abode in the territory.

In October 2016, he co-wrote a legal opinion commissioned by businessman Philip Green to challenge the conclusions of a parliamentary inquiry which criticised Green's conduct over the collapse of retailer British Home Stores.

Also in 2016, Pannick successfully represented Gina Miller in R (Miller) v Secretary of State for Exiting the European Union, an action against the Secretary of State for Exiting the European Union on whether approval by Parliament was required before the Prime Minister could initiate proceedings under Article 50 of the Treaty of the European Union to take the UK out of the European Union.

Pannick successfully led the team working on behalf of Gina Miller in R (on the application of Miller) (Appellant) v The Prime Minister (Respondent), arguing against the legality of the Government's prorogation of Parliament in September 2019. In the ruling on the morning of 24 September 2019, the UK supreme court unanimously judged that the Prime Minister Boris Johnson had given unlawful advice to the Queen.

In November 2020, Pannick appeared on behalf of Shamima Begum in the Supreme Court in Begum v Home Secretary, judicial review proceedings brought against the then Home Secretary Sajid Javid’s decision not to allow her to return to Britain for legal proceedings regarding the removal of her British citizenship.

Small house policy 
Pannick represented the Heung Yee Kuk village organization in Hong Kong, in a court case to defend the small house policy. The controversial policy allows male villagers, but not female villagers, the right to build their own house on government land in the New Territories. Pannick challenged Martin Lee, the "Father of Democracy," who represented the plaintiffs. Lee said that "Hong Kong has been waiting for so many years for someone to challenge this policy." However, Pannick argued that the plaintiff was "simply a busybody."

Publications
Judicial Review of the Death Penalty (1982, Duckworth)
Sex Discrimination Law (1985, Oxford University Press)
Judges (1987, Oxford University Press)
Advocates (1992, Oxford University Press)
Human Rights Law and Practice (general editor with Lord Lester of Herne Hill QC, Butterworths, October 1999, second edition March 2004)
I Have to Move My Car: Tales of Unpersuasive Advocates and Injudicious Judges (2008, Hart Publishing)

Personal life
He married Denise Sloam in 1978. The couple had two sons and one daughter. She died of cancer in 1999. Pannick married Israeli-born lawyer Nathalie Trager-Lewis in 2003. The couple have two daughters and a son. He is Jewish.

Hamlyn lecture 
In 2021, he delivered the Hamlyn lecture series on the subject of Advocacy.

References

External links 
 Professional biography at Blackstone Chambers
  Bookfinder.com, Books by David Pannick, KC

1956 births
Living people
People from Ilford
English Jews
People educated at Bancroft's School
Alumni of Hertford College, Oxford
Members of Gray's Inn
English King's Counsel
People's peers
Crossbench life peers
Fellows of All Souls College, Oxford
Jewish British politicians
Life peers created by Elizabeth II